Anto Joseph (born 1 June 1972) is an Indian film producer, distributor and cinema exhibitor, who works predominantly in the Malayalam Film Industry. He began his career in Malayalam Cinema in the early 90s as a Production associate. 

In 2007, he started his career as a film producer and served as the co-producer of the Mammootty starrer Big B. Later, he launched his own film production company named Anto Joseph Film Company and produced films like Malik, Take Off, The Priest etc. He is currently serving as the general secretary of Kerala Film Producers Association.

His wife Neeta Pinto also started a production and distribution company along with Priya Venu in 2009, named Aan Mega Media. It has produced and distributed a few number of Malayalam films.

Early life 
Anto Joseph was born on 1972 June 1, as the son of P M Joseph and Molly Joseph. He hails from Kottayam, Kerala and studied in SH Mount High School. While studying in Government College, Kottayam he also served as the district secretary of Kerala Students Union.

Career 
Anto began his career as a production executive in the early 90s. His served as the production controller in many hit Malayalam movies like  (Black Film), Thommanum Makkalum, Rajamanikyam and Mayavi etc.
In 2007, he started as a film producer in association with other film production companies and made his debut as a producer with Mammootty-starrer crime thriller Big B (film), which despite having a lukewarm response in the theaters later went to be one of the biggest cult following movies in Malayalam Cinema. The movie also marked the debut of popular film director Amal Neerad. In 2009, Anto had his first major breakthrough as a producer with the film Annan Thambi. The movie was directed by Anwar Rasheed and had Mammooty on the double role. The movie turned out to be one of the highest grossers of that year. In 2014, he produced his first Tamil film starring named Bramman starring Sasikumar.
Later launched his own film production company named "Anto Joseph Film Company" and produced films like Malik, Take Off, The Priest  etc.
In 2020, he produced Kannum Kannum Kollaiyadithaal in association with Viacom18 Studios with Dulquer Salmaan on the lead.
In 2017, he produced the film Take Off which was one of the most critically acclaimed films of that year. The movie was well received in the box office and went to earn many prestigious film awards including two national awards and five Kerala state film awards.He is the general secretary of Kerala Film Producers Association, vice president of Kerala Film Distributors Association and executive committee member of Kerala Film Chamber.

Personal life

Anto Joseph is married to Neeta Pinto and they have two children named Andrea Neeta Anto and Avarachan Neeta Anto.

Filmography

As Producer

in association with other producers

via Anto Joseph Film Company

via Aan Mega Media

References

External links 
 

1972 births
Living people
Malayali people
Malayalam film producers
Film producers from Kerala
Businesspeople from Kottayam
Businesspeople from Kerala
21st-century Indian businesspeople
Kerala State Film Award winners
Tamil film producers